Selver is a chain of supermarkets and hypermarkets operating in Estonia. Selver is a subsidiary of Tallinna Kaubamaja Grupp. The chain was established in 1995 with the opening of Punane Selver in Lasnamäe, Tallinn. Expansion outside of Tallinn began on 10 May 2002 with the opening of Mai Selver in Pärnu. Since 18 December 2008 Selver also operated in Latvia, but in the end of 2009 due to the financial crisis Selver was forced to close all its 6 supermarkets in Latvia. There are currently 73 stores in operation all over Estonia (as of August 2022).

In 2012 – Kulinaaria OÜ – a subsidiary of AS Selver was created. Kulinaaria, which has grown into the most modern food producer in the Baltics, currently supplies Selveri Köök’s food to Selver stores across Estonia. Other clients include the convenience stores of Olerex and Alexela, as well as Tallink ships. In addition to the Selveri Köök brand, the Van Kook and Gurmee Catering brands have also been established. 

In 2021, the home delivery area of the Selver e-store expanded to all of Estonia. With the expansion, e-Selver became the only e-grocery store that delivers goods home by courier to every country in mainland Estonia and the large islands throughout their entire extent.

Annual sales
Selver gross sales (in million Euros):
 2010               300,2
 2005 (nine months) 94,6
 2004               93,8
 2003               78,2

Stores

Hypermarkets

Supermarkets

Selver ABC

Delice supermarkets

Former stores

Comarket 
Comarket was a chain that started in 2002, the owner was ABC Supermarkets before being bought by Selver in 2020. The company that owned it used to be a sister company before being merged in May 2020. Selver announced about Comarket being rebranded as Selver ABC which started from October 2020. By the end of November all stores in Tallinn except Marja Comarket were rebranded. Due to Marja Comarket being close to Marienthali Selver the store was closed. Rebranding finished on 10 February 2021 with the last store closing on 17 February and the Comarket brand no longer exists.

References

External links
 Official website
 

Supermarkets of Estonia
Supermarkets of Latvia
Retail companies established in 1995
Estonian companies established in 1995
Economy of Tallinn